Okariki Okaru is a 2003 Indian Telugu-language romantic drama film directed by cinematographer Rasool Ellore in his directorial debut. It stars Sriram and Aarthi Chhabria. The film was praised for the non-vulgarity and classiness carried throughout.  It turned out to be a hit even though it was released without any hype or expectation.  The audio, which proved a huge hit, helped the film's gross well.  The film gained cult status in music and cinematography, which were soothing and blended with the story.

Plot 
Swapna is a non-resident Indian (NRI) who has come to India for a visit along with her grandfather. Kameshwar Rao is on a pilgrimage to Kaasi on the request of his grandmother as he had completed graduation successfully. Kamesh sees Swapna at a railway station and falls in love with her at first sight. when introducing themselves they lie their names to be as Rahul and Subba Lakshmi. 

Swapna, along with her grandfather, leaves for their relatives' place in a hurry without giving Swapna a chance to inform Rahul, but somehow Swapna places a note in Rahul's wallet before leaving. When Swapna goes to her relatives' house she learns that it was her engagement which is being arranged and is upset. Her father comes in between for the engagement and stops it as the relatives had actually cheated them on business due to which Swapna's uncle (father's brother) succumbs to cardiac arrest.

After a year Kamesh is on the hunt for his love, so he decides to go to the USA. For this purpose he gets into a software company as an engineer so that he can somehow get to the US on a work permit. The story unfolds in such a way that he goes to the US and is working under Deepak, who is Swapna's cousin. Deepak wants to marry Swapna and she almost compromises in marrying Deepak. The climax sees Kamesh meeting his love and winning it, and so the film ends with a happy note.

Cast 

 Sriram as Kameswara Rao 'Kamesh/Kamudu'/Rahul
 Aarti Chabria as Swapna/ Subba Lakshmi 
 Tanikella Bharani as Kameswara Rao's father
 Hema as Kameswara Rao's mother
 Radha Kumari as Kameswara Rao's grandmother
 Vijay Sai as Puchu alias Samaparanjaneyulu
 Mannava Balayya as Swapna Rao's grandfather
 Devan as Swapna Rao's father
 Dharmavarapu Subramanyam
 Ravi Prakash
 Ahuti Prasad
 Gautam Raju
 Duvvasi Mohan
 Vennira Aadai Nirmala
 Jahnavi as herself
 Jr. Relangi
 Manav Vij

Production 
Tamil actor Srikanth used his birth name, Sriram, as his stage name for the film to avoid confusion with established Telugu actor Srikanth. He was first credited as Sriram for Roja Poolu, the Telugu dub of Roja Koottam. Sriram sported a clean-shaven look for the first time in his career. Aarti Chabria made her Telugu debut with this film.

Soundtrack 
The music and background score was composed by M. M. Keeravani. S.S. Rajamouli, Jr. NTR and Allu Arjun attended the audio release event as chief guests. The song "Nadiradinna" was reused by Keeravani in Paheli (2005) as "Dheere Jalna".

Release

Reception 
Jeevi of Idlebrain.com praised several aspects of the film including music, screenplay, dialogues, direction and cinematography. Preetam Akkineni of Full Hyderabad called the film "clean good fun" and praised Keeravani's music for having meaningful lyrics "while still being poetic".

Awards
Nandi Awards
 Nandi Award for Best Debut Director – Rasool Ellore

References

External links 

2003 films
2000s Telugu-language films
Films scored by M. M. Keeravani
Indian romance films
2000s romance films